Vahid Paloch (born September 6, 1986) is an Iranian footballer who plays for Machine Sazi in the Azadegan League.

Club career
In 2010, Palouch joined Sanat Naft Abadan F.C. after spending the previous season at Shamoushak in the Azadegan League.

Assists

References

1986 births
Living people
Shamoushak Noshahr players
Sanat Naft Abadan F.C. players
Iranian footballers
Association football midfielders